Ian Marcus Wolfe (November 4, 1896 – January 23, 1992) was an American character actor with around 400 film and television credits. Until 1934, he worked in the theatre. That year, he appeared in his first film role and later television, as a character actor. His career lasted seven decades and included many films and TV series; his last screen credit was in 1990.

Early years
Born in Canton, Illinois, Wolfe studied at the American Academy of Dramatic Arts.

Career
Wolfe's stage debut came in The Claw (1919). His Broadway credits include The Deputy (1964), Winesburg, Ohio (1958), Lone Valley (1933), Devil in the Mind (1931), The Barretts of Wimpole Street (1931), Lysistrata (1930), The Seagull (1930), At the Bottom (1930), Skyrocket (1929), Gods of the Lightning (1928), and The Claw (1921).

Wolfe made his film debut in The Barretts of Wimpole Street (1934). He appeared in many films, including Mutiny on the Bounty (1935), Alfred Hitchcock's Saboteur (1942), Julius Caesar (1953), James Dean's Rebel Without a Cause (1955) and George Lucas's THX 1138 (1971). Although he was American by birth, his experience in the theatre gave him precise diction, and he was often cast as Englishmen on screen, including a fictional commissioner of Scotland Yard in the final film in the 1939–1946 Sherlock Holmes film series, Dressed to Kill (1946). He also appeared in three other films in the series, as an American antiques dealer in Sherlock Holmes in Washington (1943), as a butler in The Scarlet Claw (1944), and as an art dealer in The Pearl of Death (1944). He played Carter, Sir Wilfrid Robarts's clerk and office manager in Witness for the Prosecution (1957).

Wolfe played a crooked small-town doctor in "Six Gun's Legacy", an episode from the first (1949) season of The Lone Ranger. Wolfe appeared in the 1966 Perry Mason episode "The Case of the Midnight Howler" as Abel Jackson. In 1966, he portrayed the new Rev. Leighton on The Andy Griffith Show ("Aunt Bee's Crowning Glory", broadcast October 10, 1966). He also appeared in two episodes of the original Star Trek television series: "Bread and Circuses" (1968) as Septimus, and "All Our Yesterdays" (1969) as Mr. Atoz. He guest-starred in a 1977 episode of the ABC crime drama The Feather and Father Gang, and portrayed the wizard Tranquil in the series Wizards and Warriors (1983). In 1982, Wolfe had a small recurring role on the TV series WKRP in Cincinnati as Hirsch, the sarcastic, irreverent butler to WKRP owner Lillian Carlson.

Central to Wolfe's appeal as a character actor was that, until he reached actual old age, he always looked considerably older than he actually was. In the film Mad Love (1935), he played Colin Clive's stepfather, yet he was only four years older than Clive.  In the film Houdini (1953), he warned the magician to avoid occult matters, telling him to "take the advice of an old man". He appeared in movies for another 37 years; his last film credit was for Dick Tracy (1990).

Personal life
During World War I, Wolfe served in the United States Army as a volunteer medical specialist. He became a sergeant.

Wolfe wrote and self-published two books of poetry, Forty-Four Scribbles and a Prayer: Lyrics and Ballads and Sixty Ballads and Lyrics in Search of Music.

He was married to Elizabeth Schroder for 68 years, from 1924 until his death; the couple had two daughters. Wolfe died on January 23, 1992, aged 95.

Partial filmography

The Fountain (1934) as Van Arkel
The Barretts of Wimpole Street (1934) as Harry Bevan
The Mighty Barnum (1934) as Swedish consul
Clive of India (1935) as Mr. Kent (uncredited)
The Raven (1935) as Geoffrey
Mad Love (1935) as Henry Orlac (uncredited)
1,000 Dollars a Minute (1935) as Davidson (uncredited)
Mutiny on the Bounty (1935) as Maggs
The Leavenworth Case (1936) as Hudson
The Music Goes 'Round (1936) as doctor (uncredited)
The White Angel (1936) as patient (uncredited)
Romeo and Juliet (1936) as apothecary (uncredited)
The Devil Is a Sissy (1936) as pawnbroker (uncredited)
The Bold Caballero (1936) as the priest
Maytime (1937) as court official (uncredited)
The Prince and the Pauper (1937) as proprietor
The League of Frightened Men (1937) as Nicholas Cabot
The Devil Is Driving (1937) as Elias Sanders
The Emperor's Candlesticks (1937) as Leon
The Firefly (1937) as Izquierdo (uncredited)
Conquest (1937) as Prince Metternich (uncredited)
Arsène Lupin Returns (1938) as Le Marchand
Marie Antoinette (1938) as Herbert (uncredited)
You Can't Take It with You (1938) as Kirby's secretary (uncredited)
Blondie (1938) as judge
Orphans of the Street (1938) as Eli Thadius Bunting
Lincoln in the White House (1939) as a member of Lincoln's cabinet (uncredited)
Fast and Loose (1939) as Wilkes
Society Lawyer (1939) as Schmidt
Tell No Tales (1939) as Fritz (uncredited)
On Borrowed Time (1939) as Charles Wentworth
The Great Commandment (1939) as tax collector
Blondie Brings Up Baby (1939) as police judge (uncredited)
Allegheny Uprising (1939) as Poole
The Return of Doctor X (1939) as cemetery caretaker (uncredited)
The Earl of Chicago (1940) as reading clerk
Abe Lincoln in Illinois (1940) as Horace Greeley (uncredited)
Earthbound (1940) as Amos Totten
We Who Are Young (1940) as judge
Foreign Correspondent (1940) as Stiles
The Son of Monte Cristo (1940) as Conrad Stadt
Hudson's Bay (1941) as mayor
The Trial of Mary Dugan (1941) as Dr. Wriston (uncredited)
Singapore Woman (1941) as Lawyer Sidney P. Melrose (uncredited)
Love Crazy (1941) as sanity-hearing doctor (uncredited)
Adventure in Washington (1941) as Emerson (uncredited)
Shining Victory (1941) as Mr. Carew (uncredited)
Paris Calling (1941) as thin workman (uncredited)
Born to Sing (1942) as critic (uncredited)
Secret Agent of Japan (1942) as Capt. Larsen
Saboteur (1942) as Robert, the butler
Mrs. Miniver (1942) as dentist (uncredited)
Bombs Over Burma (1942) as man (uncredited)
Eagle Squadron (1942) as Sir Charles Porter
Now, Voyager (1942) as Lloyd (uncredited)
Nightmare (1942) as James
Random Harvest (1942) as registrar of births (uncredited)
The Moon Is Down (1943) as Joseph (uncredited)
Sherlock Holmes in Washington (1943) as antique store clerk (uncredited)
The Falcon in Danger (1943) as Thomas (uncredited)
The Man from Down Under (1943) as soldier seeking Father Antoine (uncredited)
Holy Matrimony (1943) as Strawley (uncredited)
Corvette K-225 (1943) as paymaster commander (uncredited)
Flesh and Fantasy (1943) as librarian (uncredited)
Government Girl (1943) as Thomas – hotel clerk (uncredited)
The Falcon and the Co-eds (1943) as Eustace L. Harley (uncredited)
The Song of Bernadette (1943) as minister of the interior (uncredited)
The Impostor (1944) as Sgt. Clerk
Her Primitive Man (1944) as Caleb
Seven Days Ashore (1944) as process server (uncredited)
Once Upon a Time (1944) as Joe (uncredited)
The White Cliffs of Dover (1944) as skipper of honeymoon boat (uncredited)
The Scarlet Claw (1944) as Drake
The Invisible Man's Revenge (1944) as Feeney
Are These Our Parents? (1944) as Pa Henderson
Wilson (1944) as reporter (uncredited)
The Pearl of Death (1944) as Amos Hodder
Reckless Age (1944) as Prof. Mellasagus (uncredited)
In Society (1944) as butler (uncredited)
The Merry Monahans (1944) as clerk
Babes on Swing Street (1944) as Anjsel (uncredited)
The National Barn Dance (1944) as minister (uncredited)
Mystery of the River Boat (1944 serial) as Herman Einreich (Chapters 1–3)
Murder in the Blue Room (1944) as Edwards
The Bandit of Sherwood Forest (1945) as Lord Mortimer
A Song to Remember (1945) as Pleyel's clerk (uncredited)
Zombies on Broadway (1945) as Prof. Hopkins
Counter-Attack (1945) as Ostrovski (uncredited)
Blonde Ransom (1945) as Oliver
The Brighton Strangler (1945) as Lord Mayor Herman Brandon R. Clive
Love Letters (1945) as Vicar (uncredited)
Strange Confession (1945) as Frederick (uncredited)
This Love of Ours (1945) as Dr. Straus (uncredited)
Confidential Agent (1945) as Dr. Bellows
The Fighting Guardsman (1946) as Prefect Berton (uncredited)
Tomorrow Is Forever (1946) as Norton
Three Strangers (1946) as Gillkie the Barrister (uncredited)
The Notorious Lone Wolf (1946) as Adam Wheelright
Bedlam (1946) as Sidney Long
Without Reservations (1946) as Charlie Gibbs (uncredited)
Dressed to Kill (1946) as commissioner of Scotland Yard
The Searching Wind (1946) as Sears
Gentleman Joe Palooka (1946) as Editor W.W. Dwight
The Verdict (1946) as Jury Foreman (uncredited)
The Falcon's Adventure (1946) as J.D. Denison
California (1947) as President James K. Polk (uncredited)
That Way with Women (1947) as L.B. Crandall
Pursued (1947) as Coroner (uncredited)
Dishonored Lady (1947) as Dr. E.G. Lutz (uncredited)
The Marauders (1947) as Deacon Black
Wild Harvest (1947) as Martin (uncredited)
Desire Me (1947) as Dr. Poulin (uncredited)
The Judge Steps Out (1947) as Hector Brown
If Winter Comes (1947) as Dr. Clement Avington (uncredited)
Three Daring Daughters (1948) as Martin (uncredited)
The Miracle of the Bells (1948) as Grave Digger (uncredited)
Mr. Blandings Builds His Dream House (1948) as Smith
Johnny Belinda (1948) as rector (uncredited)
Silver River (1948) as process server (uncredited)
They Live by Night (1948) as Hawkins
Julia Misbehaves (1948) as Hobson, the butler
Homicide (1949) as Fritz (uncredited)
Bride of Vengeance (1949) as councillor (uncredited)
The Younger Brothers (1949) as chairman of parole board
Manhandled (1949) as Charlie (uncredited)
Colorado Territory (1949) as Homer Wallace
Joe Palooka in the Counterpunch (1949) as Prof. Lilliquist
My Friend Irma (1949) as minister (uncredited)
Please Believe Me (1950) as Edward Warrender
No Way Out (1950) as Watkins (uncredited)
The Petty Girl (1950) as President Webb (uncredited)
Copper Canyon (1950) as Mr. Henderson
Emergency Wedding (1950) as Dr. White (uncredited)
The Magnificent Yankee (1950) as Adams
A Place in the Sun (1951) as Dr. Wyeland (uncredited)
The Great Caruso (1951) as Hutchins
Mask of the Avenger (1951) as Signor Donner
Here Comes the Groom (1951) as Uncle Adam
On Dangerous Ground (1951) as Sheriff Carrey
The Captive City (1952) as Rev. Nash
Holiday for Sinners (1952) as Monsignor Lavaud (uncredited)
Les Misérables (1952) as presiding judge (uncredited)
Captain Pirate (1952) as Viceroy (uncredited)
Something for the Birds (1952) as Foster
Julius Caesar (1953) as Ligarius
Scandal at Scourie (1953) as Councilman Hurdwell
Young Bess (1953) as Stranger (uncredited)
Houdini (1953) as Malue
99 River Street (1953) as Waldo Daggett
The Actress (1953) as Mr. Bagley
About Mrs. Leslie (1954) as Mr. Pope
Seven Brides for Seven Brothers (1954) as Rev. Elcott
Her Twelve Men (1954) as Roger Frane
The Steel Cage (1954) as Curly Henderson (segment "The Face") (uncredited)
The Silver Chalice (1954) as Theron
Moonfleet (1955) as Tewkesbury
The King's Thief (1955) as Fell
Rebel Without a Cause (1955) as Dr. Minton
Sincerely Yours (1955) as Mr. Rojeck (uncredited)
The Court-Martial of Billy Mitchell (1955) as President Calvin Coolidge
Diane (1956) as Lord Tremouille
Gaby (1956) as registrar
Witness for the Prosecution (1957) as H. A. Carter
Pollyanna (1960) as Mr. Neely
The Lost World (1960) as Burton White
All in a Night's Work (1961) as O'Hara
The Wonderful World of the Brothers Grimm (1962) as Gruber
Diary of a Madman (1963) as Pierre
One Man's Way (1964) as Bishop Hardwick
Games (1967) as Dr. Edwards
THX 1138 (1971) as PTO
The Terminal Man (1974) as priest
Homebodies (1974) as Mr. Loomis
The Fortune (1975) as justice of peace
I Wonder Who's Killing Her Now? (1975) as Philips the butler
Mr. Sycamore (1975) as Abner / Arnie
Mean Dog Blues (1978) as judge
The Seniors (1978) as Mr. Bleiffer
The Frisco Kid (1979) as Father Joseph
Up the Academy (1980) as Commandant Causeway
Reds (1981) as Mr. Partlow
Jinxed! (1982) as Morley
Creator (1985) as Prof. Brauer
Checking Out (1989) as Mr. D'Amato
Dick Tracy (1990) as forger (final film role)

Partial television credits
Bonanza, episode "The Avenger" (1960) as Ed Baxter; episode "Bank Run" (1961) as John J. Harrison; episode "The Many Faces of Gideon Flinch" (1961) as Gideon Flinch; episode "The Spotlight" (1965) as Amos
The Twilight Zone, episode "Uncle Simon" (1963), as Schwimmer
The Fugitive, episode "Nightmare in Northoak" (1963), as Dr. Babcock
The Invaders, episode "Doomsday Minus One" (1967), as Secretary Rosmundson
Star Trek, episode "Bread and Circuses" (1968), as Septimus; episode "All Our Yesterdays" (1969), as Mr. Atoz
The Partridge Family, episode "Road Song" (1971), as Maggie's grandfather
The Devil's Daughter (1973 film) - (American Broadcasting Company) Television film, 9th. Jan.)A Touch of Grace, episode "The Reunion" (1973)The Mary Tyler Moore Show, episode "Anyone Who Hates Kids and Dogs" (1975), as GrandfatherWonder Woman, episode "The New Original Wonder Woman" (1975), as Bank ManagerAll In The Family, episode "Unequal Partners" (1977), as Herbert HooperBarney Miller, Season 4, episode "Thanksgiving" (1977), as unnamed psyche-ward patientTaxi, Season 2, episode "Honor Thy Father" (1979), as the old man in the hospitalWKRP in Cincinnati, episode "A Simple Little Wedding" (1981), "The Consultant" (1981), "Love, Exciting and New" (1982), "Up and Down the Dial" (1982) as Hirsch – Mrs Carlson's butlerBarney Miller, episode "The Tontine" (1982), as Joseph SpidonieCheers'', episode "One for the Book" (1982), as Buzz Crowder

References

External links

 

1896 births
1992 deaths
20th-century American male actors
20th-century American male writers
20th-century American poets
American male film actors
American male poets
American male stage actors
Combat medics
Male actors from Illinois
Male Western (genre) film actors
Military personnel from Illinois
People from Canton, Illinois
Poets from Illinois
United States Army non-commissioned officers
United States Army personnel of World War I
Western (genre) television actors